Newark Air Museum is an air museum located on a former Royal Air Force station at Winthorpe, near Newark-on-Trent in Nottinghamshire, England. The museum contains a variety of aircraft.

History
The airfield was known as RAF Winthorpe during the Second World War, opening in September 1940. From 1942 to 1944, it housed No. 1661 Heavy Conversion Unit, training Avro Lancaster crews, in No. 5 Group with around thirty planes. In 1944 it joined No. 7 Group, still within Bomber Command. In 1945 it transferred to Transport Command.

The following units were posted at RAF Winthorp at some point:
 No. 54 Maintenance Unit.
 No. 61 Maintenance Unit.
 No. 1331 Heavy Transport Conversion Unit.
 No. 1333 (Transport Support) Conversion Unit which became No. 1333 (Transport Support) Training Unit RAF]].
 Central Servicing Development Establishment RAF.

In 1964,  of the former airfield were purchased by the Newark and Nottinghamshire Agricultural Society, who have since held the Newark and Nottinghamshire County Show. A limited company called Newark (Nottinghamshire and Lincolnshire) Air Museum was formed in 1968. The museum officially opened on 14 April 1973. In 1990, the museum opened its first exhibition hall. This was followed by the purchase of an additional  of land that became known as the Southfield Site. A second display hall was opened on this property in 2004.

Aircraft on display

Cockpitfest

The Air Museum has, for the past few years, hosted the annual Cockpitfest. This popular event calls on enthusiasts and 'cockpitters' alike to bring their memorabilia for others to see and, in the case of cockpits, get inside. The Cockpitfest celebrated its 10th anniversary in June 2009.

See also
 List of aerospace museums

Notes

References

External links

 Newark Air Museum website
 Nottinghamshire and the jump jet
 Museum gallery at BBC Nottingham
 History of RAF Winthorpe
 Neighbouring showground

Aerospace museums in England
Museums in Nottinghamshire
Museums established in 1973
Military history of Nottinghamshire
Newark-on-Trent
1973 establishments in England